Drachen may refer to:

"Drachen", song by Einstürzende Neubauten  from Strategies Against Architecture III 2001
"Drachen", song by Sarah Connor  from Herz Kraft Werke
Drachen Studio Kecur, a German ultralight aircraft manufacturer based in Mettmann, North Rhine-Westphalia.
 Drachen, a type of German Kite balloon used in WW1 for artillery observation.